The  is a department of the Imperial Household Agency of Japan. The board is the chief administration charged with ceremonial matters.

History
The Bureau underwent the current name  change in October 1884.

Organisation 
However, the post has historically gone under the name .

The Grand Master is assisted by two . One of them has , while the other has .

The other Vice-Grand Master is charged foreign matters, i.e., with assisting in coordinating various court functions held for visiting foreign dignitaries. He is also responsible for such activities as the Imperial Family's State visits to foreign countries.

Music Department 

It is the board's , which performs both , i.e. ancient court music, and Western classical music.

Wild Duck Preserves 

The hunting parties at the kamoba preserves invites guests to participate in traditional wild-duck netting, where the wildfowl are tagged. It should be mentioned that the guests invited to the netting are often diplomatic missions and plenipotentiaries from foreign countries, although cabinet members, members of the National Diet, and Supreme Court Justices are extended invitations also.

Grand Masters of Ceremonies 
Below is a historic list of grand masters from 1947:

{| class="wikitable"
!Number!!Name!!Term in Office!!Remarks
|-
!colspan="4"|
|-
|rowspan="2" align="center"| – ||rowspan="2"|||Mar 27, 1947 – May 2, 1947||Granted  status.<ref group="lower-alpha">A shinninkan" is the highest ranked official, appointed by the emperor, higher in status than chokuninkan appointed by imperial edict/decree.</ref>
|-
|May 3, 1947 – May 31, 1949||
|-
!colspan="4"|
|-
|align="right"|1||Matsudaira Yasumasa||Jun 1, 1949 – Jan 4, 1957 (died in office)||
|-
|align="right"|2||||Feb 1, 1957  – Sep 10, 1968 (resigned)||
|-
|align="right"|3||||Sep 10, 1968  – Jan 16, 1973 (resigned)||
|-
|align="right"|4||||January 16, 1973 – August 14, 1979 (resigned)||
|-
|align="right"|5||||Aug 14, 1979 – Jun 20, 1989 (resigned)||
|-
|align="right"|6||||Jun 20, 1989 – Sep 8, 1995 (resigned)||
|-
|align="right"|7||||Sep 8, 1995 – Dec 12, 1996||
|-
|align="right"|8||||Dec 12, 1996 – Jul 8, 2003 (resigned)||
|-
|align="right"|9||||Jul 8, 2003 – Jun 15, 2007||
|-
|align="right"|10||||Jun 15, 2007 – Oct 4, 2009 (died in office)||
|-
|align="center"| – ||()||Oct 8, 2009 – Oct 20, 2009||Acting GM (Vice-GM)
|-
|align="right"|11||||Oct 20, 2009 – Sep 1, 2012 (resigned) ||
|-
|align="right"|12||||Sep 1, 2012 – present||
|}

Explanatory notes

Citations

References
 Titsingh, Isaac. (1834). Nihon Odai Ichiran''; ou,  Annales des empereurs du Japon.  Paris: Royal Asiatic Society, Oriental Translation Fund of Great Britain and Ireland.  OCLC 5850691
 Varley, H. Paul. (1980).  Jinnō Shōtōki: A Chronicle of Gods and Sovereigns. New York: Columbia University Press. ;  OCLC 59145842

External links
 Imperial Household Agency | Board of Ceremonies

701 establishments
8th-century establishments in Japan
Government of feudal Japan
Imperial Household Agency
Positions of authority